Suffocation is an American death metal band formed in 1988 in Centereach, New York, currently consisting of lead guitarist Terrance Hobbs, bassist Derek Boyer, rhythm guitarist Charlie Errigo, drummer Eric Morotti, and vocalist Ricky Myers. The band rose to prominence with the 1991 debut album Effigy of the Forgotten, which became a blueprint for death metal in the 1990s. Since then, Suffocation has recorded a further seven albums. These feature growled vocals with downtuned guitars, fast and complex guitar riffs and drumming, open chord notes and occasional breakdowns.

History

Early years and the 1990s era (1988–1998)
Suffocation was formed in 1988 in Long Island, New York, by vocalist Frank Mullen, guitarists Guy Marchais and Todd German, bassist Josh Barohn, and a drummer whose name has not been disclosed. By 1990, the band had replaced their founding members with hired guitarists Terrance Hobbs and Doug Cerrito along with drummer Mike Smith, who were members of a local band called Mortuary, which had already disbanded. The quintet was mainly influenced by fellow American death metal bands as well as the Britain's Napalm Death and Brazil's Sepultura. Suffocation would be unique among the death metal community for featuring black musicians in their lineup, with Smith commenting on meeting Hobbs for the first time: "That's where I first noticed, 'Wow, there's another black guy playing this kind of stuff.'" They signed a contract with Relapse Records in 1990, becoming one of the first three bands to sign onto the newly founded label alongside Incantation and Deceased. The band's first EP, Human Waste, was released through Relapse Records in 1991. 

The first full-length debut album, Effigy of the Forgotten, was recorded by producer Scott Burns at Tampa's Morrisound Studios and released by Roadrunner Records in 1991. Effigy of the Forgotten would gain critical and fan acclaim and become greatly influential in extreme metal music and later become a key influence in brutal death metal, as well as in deathcore subgenres. 

In July 1991, founding bassist John Barohn was replaced by Chris Richards (ex Apparition/Sorrow). He left the band to join Autopsy.

In 1993, the sophomore album Breeding the Spawn was released, its production and mixing being a key weak point that would be immediately harshly criticized. Originally, the band was due to return to Morrisound and record the album with Scott Burns, but Roadrunner was unwilling to fund the album properly and refused to pay for the studio time, forcing them to record elsewhere. After this album, drummer Mike Smith left the band, the situation with the recording process for this album being a major reason for him leaving the band, and was replaced by Doug Bohn. Tracks of Breeding the Spawn would be re-recorded in future Suffocation releases.

The 1995 release Pierced from Within, which received better production than the previous release, was followed by extensive tours in Europe, Canada, Mexico and the United States. In 1998, Suffocation released the EP Despise the Sun via Vulture Records and disbanded soon after. The EP was re-released later in 2000 and 2002 by Relapse Records.

Reunion and later (2003–present) 

Mullen and Hobbs reformed in 2003 with Smith, returning founding members Guy Marchais on guitar, and Josh Barohn on bass. Barohn would not last long, and left the band soon. Suffocation would then hire bassist Derek Boyer of the bands Deeds of Flesh and Decrepit Birth. In April 2004, Relapse Records released Souls to Deny. After the band played more than 400 shows in the United States and Europe including the Wacken Festival in Germany, playing to over 33,000 fans, Suffocation released their self-titled album, Suffocation, in 2006. In 2007, the band was featured in The History Channel's promotional video for The Dark Ages documentary, playing the song "Bind, Torture, Kill".

In 2008, the band signed to the German Nuclear Blast Records and released their album Blood Oath in 2009. The album charted on the US Billboard 200 at number 135. In 2009, Relapse released the live album entitled Close of a Chapter—Live in Québec City, that was previously self-released by the band in 2005. The release of a documentary film Legacy of Violence was set for 2010, but has since been delayed. In May 2010, Suffocation toured with Napalm Death in South America and Mexico. In February 2012, Smith left the band again, to be replaced by the returning Dave Culross.

In 2012, the band was inducted into the Long Island Music Hall of Fame and released Pinnacle of Bedlam in February 2013. Since after the release of Pinnacle of Bedlam in 2013, vocalist Frank Mullen announced that he will retire from full-time touring with the band due to his new job.  He has since been replaced by various live vocal stand ins, including Bill Robinson, John Gallagher, Kevin Muller, and, currently, Ricky Myers.

In January 2015, Suffocation began making posts revealing that they were in the process of recording demos for a new album with a potential release date of late 2015. In April 2016, the ensemble toured with Soulfly, Abnormality, Battlecross and Lody Kong.

The new album's name was revealed as ...Of the Dark Light and was released on June 9, 2017.  Later in 2017, Kevin Muller, who had previously been a touring member, joined the band full-time alongside longtime vocalist Frank Mullen leading the two to share vocal duties on the last album. He subsequently stepped down at the end of the year and was replaced by a returning Myers in 2018. On March 12, 2018, it was announced that Frank Mullen would do one more tour with Suffocation before officially retiring from the band. On January 15, 2019 it was announced that Mullen would return in June 2019 for a final tour of Japan.

Musical style and legacy

Suffocation is one of the earliest groups to redefine the death metal style that is recognized today. The band uses "outrageously guttural vocals with a bottom-heavy guitar foundation, blistering speed, unparalleled brutality and sophisticated sense of songwriting, complex time changes and lead and rhythm guitar acrobatics" and occasional slam riffs and breakdowns.

With their debut album, Effigy of the Forgotten, Suffocation rose to prominence of death metal and created a blueprint for the genre for the 1990s, retaining their style after the reunion in 2003. Decibel Magazine stated: "Effigy of the Forgotten was a benchmark for extreme music, as it sacrificed neither virtuosity or brutality, becoming a signpost for thousands who were still contemplating how to incorporate scalar runs, rapid-fire palm-muting and hummingbird-wing-quick picking into riffs, while opening up rhythmic dimensions and the scope of the blast beat."

Blabbermouth.net described Suffocation as "American death metal's most consistent and punishing standard-bearers" and their style as "brutal death metal". According to AllMusic, Mullen is one of the best vocalists in death metal. Decibel Magazine stated: "One of Suffocation's trademarks, breakdowns, has spawned an entire metal subgenre: deathcore." Suffocation is also one of the pioneers of technical death metal.

Members

Current
 Terrance Hobbs – lead guitar (1990–1998, 2003–present)
 Derek Boyer – bass (2004–present)
 Charlie Errigo – rhythm guitar (2016–present)
 Eric Morotti – drums (2016–present)
 Ricky Myers – vocals (2019–present; live member: 2015–2016, 2018)

Former
 Frank Mullen – vocals (1988–1998, 2003–2019)
 Todd German – lead guitar (1988–1990)
 Guy Marchais – rhythm guitar (1988–1990, 2003–2016)
 Doug Cerrito – rhythm guitar (1990–1998)
 Josh Barohn – bass (1988–1991, 2003–2004)
 Chris Richards – bass (1991–1998)
 Mike Smith – drums (1990–1994, 2003–2012)
 Doug Bohn – drums (1994–1995)
 Dave Culross – drums (1995–1998, 2012–2014)
 Kevin Talley – drums (2014–2016)

Former live musicians
 Bill Robinson – vocals (2012)
 John Gallagher – vocals (2013)
 Kevin Muller – vocals (2017)

Timeline

Discography

Studio albums

Live albums

Extended plays

Compilation albums

Demos

Music videos

Notes
A. Since the release of Pinnacle of Bedlam in 2013 until his retirement from the band in 2018, Frank Mullen announced that he would be retiring from full-time touring with the band due to his new job.  He has since been replaced by various live vocal stand-ins, including Bill Robinson, John Gallagher, Ricky Myers, and Kevin Muller.

References

External links

Official website

1988 establishments in New York (state)
American technical death metal musical groups
Articles which contain graphical timelines
Death metal musical groups from New York (state)
Heavy metal musical groups from New York (state)
Musical groups established in 1988
Musical groups from Long Island
Musical quintets
Nuclear Blast artists
Relapse Records artists
Roadrunner Records artists